Mohamed Basri may refer to:
 Fqih Basri, political activist and Moroccan regime opponent
 Mohamed Basri (wrestler), Moroccan wrestler